Paadam is a 2018 Indian Tamil-language drama film written and directed by Rajasekhar and produced by Gipin P.S. The film stars newcomers Karthik and Mona as school students, Vijith, Nagendran in the lead roles while Yashika Aannand and Jangiri Madhumita provide pivotal roles in the film. The music is scored by Ganesh Raghavendra. The film was released on 27 May 2018.

Plot 
A school boy named Jeeva, who is the son of police officer Kottai Perumal, questions the inabilities and defects in the Indian educational system and also shows his frustration towards studying lessons in English instead of Tamil. On the other hand, Jeeva's father also hesitates and feels afraid to speak in English. If Jeeva hears even a single English word, he becomes frustrated. One day, Kottai Perumal was sent on a transfer to Chennai after his unruly behaviour with a higher police officer who did not know to speak in Tamil. At the same time, Jeeva is excited as he thinks that he can avoid learning English by leaving the village to Chennai. But Jeeva is compelled by his father to study in English as his father desired him to be fluent in the language. Jeeva attended the high school and started to learn English, but his English master, is punitive toward students who have difficulty with English. But Jeeva gets support and advice from his Hindi language teacher and escapes from the school. When his father learns of this, he politely requested his son to study in English medium. Finally after his father's request, he changes and learns English.

Cast 
 Karthik as Jeeva
 Mona as Jeeva's friend
 V. R. Nagendran as Kottai Perumal, Jeeva's father,
 Jangiri Madhumita as Jeeva's mother
 Vijith as an English master in Chennai high school
 Yashika Aannand as Hindi teacher

References

External links 
 

Indian drama films
2018 drama films
2010s Tamil-language films